A thyroxine-binding protein is any of several transport proteins that bind thyroid hormone and carry it around the bloodstream. Examples include:

 Thyroxine-binding globulin
 Transthyretin
 Serum albumin

External links
 

Human proteins
Blood proteins